Racetime is a 2018 Canadian computer-animated adventure comedy film directed by Benoît Godbout. A sequel to the 2015 film Snowtime! (La Guerre des tuques 3D), the film focuses on the same group of children organizing a sled race over their winter holiday.

The film's English version premiered in theatres on January 25, 2019.

Production
The film's French theme song, "Ensemble", was written and recorded by Dumas, while the English translation, "Together", was recorded by Cyndi Lauper. Other songs included in the soundtrack were performed by Alex Nevsky, Garou, Ludovick Bourgeois, Alexe Gaudreault, Corneille, Simple Plan and Lara Fabian.

Box office
The film was listed as the eighth highest grossing Canadian film of 2018 as of December 20; however, by January 1, 2019 it had reached $1.7 million at the box office, surging to fifth place. By March 14, 2019, the film had grossed $2.6 million in Canada.

Characters

References

External links
 Official website
 

2018 films
2018 computer-animated films
Canadian animated feature films
Canadian children's animated films
Canadian Christmas films
French-language Canadian films
2010s Canadian films